Superball+ is an EP by American indie rock band Helium. It was released on September 19, 1995, on Matador Records.

Critical reception
AllMusic praised the title track, writing that "Mary Timony's insightful, metaphoric lyrics are paired with an offbeat, whimsical melody ... [it's] the best track on the EP." The Austin Chronicle wrote that "What Institution Are You From?" "broods with a hypnotic beat and slinky bassline." Spin included the title track on its list of the 20 best singles of 1995, writing that Timony's "coyly distorted guitar may be indie rock's most intriguing instrument."

Track listing

Personnel
Mary Timony – Organ, Bass, Guitar, Keyboards, Vocals, Xylophone
Ash Bowie – Bass, Guitar, Keyboards
Shawn King Devlin – Percussion, Drums
Adam Lasus – Producer
Eric Masunaga – Engineer, Mixing

References

1995 EPs
Helium (band) albums
Matador Records EPs